Durău is a ski resort in north-eastern Romania. Durău may also refer to
Durău, a tributary of the river Schit in Neamț County, Romania 
Cornel Durău (born 1957), Romanian handball player